Octopart.com is a search engine for electronic and industrial parts headquartered in New York, NY. It aggregates parts from distributors and manufacturers online, making them easy to search for and purchase. It is free for users, and as of August 2014, over 700,000 unique visitors search the database of 30 million electronic components per month. Octopart's mission is "to open up access to part data for design, sourcing, and manufacturing".

History 
Octopart was created by three physics grad-school dropouts, Andres Morey, Sam Wurzel,  and Harish Agarwal, in 2007. After coming up with the idea for the site and leaving graduate school, Morey and Wurzel worked with Paul Graham and Jessica Livingston's  Y Combinator. The company has been profitable since 2010. Octopart currently works with some of the largest distributors in the industry.

In August 2015 Octopart announced that they had become a wholly owned subsidiary of Altium Limited, but will operate independently from their New York City headquarters.

References 

Y Combinator companies